Võ Nhai is a rural district of Thái Nguyên province in the Northeast region of Vietnam. As of 2003 the district had a population of 12,364. The district covers an area of 845 km². The district capital lies at Đình Cả.

Administrative divisions
Đình Cả, Bình Long, Cúc Đường, Dân Tiến, La Hiên, Lâu Thượng, Liên Minh, Nghinh Tường, Phú Thượng, Phương Giao, Sảng Mộc, Thần Sa, Thượng Nung, Tràng Xá, Vũ Chấn

References

Districts of Thái Nguyên province
Thái Nguyên province